On 8 June 1991, a train crash killed over 100 people in Ghotki, Sindh, Pakistan. A passenger train carrying 800 passengers from Karachi to Lahore crashed into a parked freight train.

References

1991 in Pakistan
1991 disasters in Pakistan
1991 train crash
June 1991 events in Asia